Although most of Percy Pitt's compositions seem to have been performed during his lifetime, not everything was published; and not every published work received an opus number. Many of his works were published by Augener, who also published Bridge, Delius and Ireland. Some works appear to have been given an opus number after the volume was published some time before 1910. However, gaps still apparently remain in the sequence of opus numbers, e.g. Op. 2, 7, 12, 13 etc. Nevertheless, the opus numbers seem to have been chronologically assigned in approximate composition order.

A number of works exist both in versions for orchestra and for piano reduction (solo or duet), and the dates assigned to many of the entries in this incomplete list should be treated with caution.

According to his own introduction in Pitt's biography, Henry Wood gave the first performances of most of Pitt's major works after 1896 except the G minor Sinfonietta which was written at the request of Hans Richter, who conducted it at the 1906 Birmingham Triennial Music Festival.

List of works without opus number
Orchestra
Suite in D major - Prelude & Bourrée (1891)
Orchestral Suite (Suite d'Orchestre?) in four movements (1895)
Overture, "Taming of the Shrew". (1898)
Hercules March (1898)
Incidental music for "Paolo and Francesca". (1902)
Incidental music to 'Flodden Field' (1902) 
Incidental music to 'Richard II' (1903)
Symphony (Sinfonietta) in G minor (1906) 
English Rhapsody (1910)
Serenade for small orchestra (1911)
Sakura suite No. 1 (1914)
Sakura suite No. 2 (Suite de Ballet) (1915)
Ballet Egyptien (1915)
Suite pour petite orchestre (1915)
Symphonic poem 'Anactoria', for viola and orchestra.

Chamber
Piano Trio (1890)

Piano
Tarantella in C, for piano. (1902)
Improvisation, for piano. (pub. Ascherberg, 1919)
Carnet de Voyage, pour piano. (1928)
1. Prelude 2. Souvenir 3. Sérénade à la lune 4. Berceuse 5. Valse mignonne.
Five Dances - Suite in the old style, for piano, etc. (orch?) (1930)

Songs with Orchestra
Five Poems for baritone & orchestra (after Lenau, Cornelius, Dahn, Tasso, etc.? (1902)
Four Poems for mezzo-soprano & orchestra. (1904)
'Sérénade du passant' for soprano and orchestra, for Luisa Tetrazzini (1912)

Solo songs
A Free Lance (pub. Leonard)
Edenland (pub. Willcocks) 
Fedora - Gavotte
For Memory's Sake (pub. Ascherberg)
Her coming (pub. Ricordi)
Let us forget (1928)
Lines to his Ladye (after a 17th-century poem by H. Byatt). (1894) 
Love is a Dream (Alfred Austin). (pub. Elkin, 1903).
Springtime (1928)
Week before Easter (arr. Sussex folk song)
When we two parted (pub. Ascherberg)
Year after year (pub. Boosey)
Yesterday and Today (Frances H. Burnett). Unpublished holograph MS dated 6 November 1892.
When I am dead, my dearest. (words, C. Rossetti) (pub. Gale, Weekes) (1896)

Chorus
The Blessed Damozel, for chorus and orchestra.
Schwerting the Saxon, for chorus and orchestra.
Zephyr, stay thy vagrant flight.  Glee for TTBB male voices (1894) 
Der Trauernde Jager (The Stricken Hunter), for 6-part chorus. (1912)

List of works with opus number
Op. 1: Bagatelles, for Violin & Piano 
1.  Air de Ballet, 2. Lamento, 3. Romance,  4. Gavotte 5. Amoroso 6. Moto Perpetuo Souvenir.
Op. 2
Op. 3: Part Songs for ATBB Male Voices. (1895)
1. Sunset. 2. Serenade - While my Lady sleepeth.  (Trans. J. G. Lockhart ) 3. A Cavalier's Song (G. J. Whyte-Melville) 
Op. 4: Silhouettes (first set). Trois morceaux, for piano. (1895) Orch. by the composer (1907?)
1. 'Scene de Ballet'  2. Feuillet d'Album 3. Etude Mignonne
Op. 5: Hohenlinden, cantata for TTBB men's chorus and orchestra. (Words by Thomas Campbell.)(London: Novello, c1889) 
Op. 6: Part songs for chorus. 
1. A Song at Evening, SATB (S. K. Wiley).  2. Love is a Sickness full of Woes, Madrigal in 6 parts.
Op. 7
Op.8: Aquarelles, for violin & piano/orch? 
1. Canzonetta. 2. Chant d'Automne. 3. Valse Oubliee. 
Op. 9: Le Sang des Crépuscules: Prélude Symphonique d'après Charles Guérin. (Orch. 1900?)
Op. 10: The Sorrows of Werther. Humorous quartet for ATBB men's voices (W. M. Thackeray) (1901)
Op. 11: Miniatures. 3 Morceaux for piano. (London, Augener & Co., Sept 1894)
 1. Gavotte et Musette. 2. Lointain passé. 3. Scherzino.
Op. 12
Op. 13
Op. 14: Pensées Fugitives, for piano. 
 1. En Valsant. 2. In Memoriam 3. Mélodie Intime
Op. 15
Op. 16: Impressions. Trois Morceaux pour piano. (1895)
 1. Improvisation. 2. Veille de Départ. 3. Humoresque
Op. 17: Ballade for violin and orchestra (or violin & piano) (1900)
Op. 18: Three Romantic Pieces for cello & piano. (1896)
 1. Petite Romance 2. Arioso 3. Feux follets
Op. 19
Op. 20: Modern Suite (Suite de Ballet) for orchestra. (1896) Also ?arr. piano as 4 Morceaux?
 1. Prelude. 2. Minuetto. 3. Ballade. 4. Scherzo-Valse
Op. 21: Coronation March, for orchestra. Also arr. piano. (1896/7)
Op.22: Concertino in C minor for clarinet and orchestra. Also arr. clarinet & piano. (1897) 
Op. 23
Op. 24: Fêtes Galantes. Miniature Suite for Orchestra after Verlaine. (1896) Also arr. for piano duet, and for piano solo (at least Colombine) by the composer (1897)
1. Cortege 2. Marionettes 3. Sentimental interlude 4. Colombine (Valse) 5. Finale. 
Op. 25
Op.26: Cinderella, a musical fairy tale for pianoforte duet. London, G. Ricordi & Co., 1899. Illustrated by Nelia Casella Also orchestrated by the composer. Illustrated piano duet score at imslp. Two extracts on YouTube.
Op. 27: Four Little Songs, for voice and piano.
1. Hildachen (E. Breck) 2. An Orchard Fancy. (K. Munkittrick) 3. The White Rose 4. Springtime (W.D. Howells) 
Op. 28
Op. 29: Harmonies d'Autonne, for piano. (1899)
1. Promenade sentimentale. 2. Valse mélancolique. 3. Crépuscule
Op. 30: Part-songs, for SATB chorus & piano. (1899/1900)
1. To Night. 2. Shepherds all and Maidens fair. (E. Nesbit) 3.  A Love Symphony (O'Shaughnessy) 4. Love is a Sickness
Op. 31
Op. 32 no. 2: Behold the Name of the Lord, Christmas anthem for SATB chorus. (Novello's Anthems, etc. No. 652) (1899)
Op. 32a: Oriental Rhapsody, for piano. (1903) Arranged for orchestra by the composer (1905).
Op. 33: Genre-Pictures, for piano. (1900)
1. Fughetta. 2. In an Album. 3. Serenatella. 4 Ländler.  5. Etüde-Nocturne.
Op. 33: Dance Rhythms, for orchestra. (1901) Also arr. for piano.
1. Espana. 2. Sarabanda. 3. Valse caprice
Op. 34: Trois Poésies, for voice and piano.
1. Je ne veux pas autre chose. 2. Parting. 3. Sérénade
Op. 35: Paolo & Francesca, Symphonic Impressions for orchestra, on the incidental music for Stephen Phillip's tragedy. (1902).
Op. 36: Part songs. (1901?)
1. O Nightingale. (Five parts) (Wordsworth).  2? Laugh at Loving if You Will.
Op. 37: Silhouettes (second set), for piano. (London: Augener & Co., 1902)
1. Préambule. 2. Dirge. 3. Barcarolle 4. Intermezzo. 5. Caprice.
Op. 38
Op. 39: Five Sketches for piano. (1903)
1. Allegretto scherzando. 2. Alla Marcia. 3. Entr'acte. 4 Pizzicato. 5. Gavotte & Musette
Op. 39: Serenade, for small orchestra. 
Op. 40: Three Old English Dances from the incidental music to King Richard II, for orchestra. (1904) Arr. for piano solo by the composer.
1. Country Dance. 2. Measure. 3. Morris Dance.
Op. 41: Three pieces for violin & piano. (Schott) 
1. Air. 2. Fileuse. 3. Pensée d'Automne.
Op. 42
Op. 43
Op. 44: Three Songs, for voice and piano. (1914)
1. Let us forget. (M. Robinson.) 2. Winter. (Words by D. F. D.) 3. Thoughts at sunrise (George Meredith)
Op. 45: Four Pieces, for piano. (1907) 
Book I:  Prélude; Étude. Book II: Widmung; Fantasia Appassionata for 4 hands(?)
Op. 46
Op. 47
Op. 48: England’s Welcome. (1907)
Op. 49
Op. 50
Op. 51
Op. 52: Suite de ballet,for orchestra. (1901)
1. Saraband. 2. Valsette. 3. Gavotte 4.Musette.
Op. 53
Op. 54: Some Impressions and an Epilogue, for piano. 
3. Aubade (Totland Bay). ?. Guitares et Mandolines.

Piano scores and English versions of works by others
 Ludwig der Springer. Opera in three Acts, Op. 12. Libretto & music by Adolf Sandberger. Piano score by Percy Pitt and Wilhelm Ammermann.
 Gianni Schicchi (Puccini). Libretto by Giovacchino Forzano. English version by Percy Pitt. Vocal score (English and Italian)  Milano : G. Ricordi e C. Edit. Tip., 1930
 The Vagabond and the Princess. Opera in one act by E. Poldini. Adapted from a fairy tale of Hans Christian Andersen by A.F. Seligmann; English version by Alfred Kalisch and Percy Pitt. (First performance, May 11, 1906)

References
Notes

Citations

Bibliography
This list was chiefly compiled from the following sources:
  (Edited from Pitt's unpublished MS autobiography) 
 
 

 'Percy Pitt' at the BBC Proms Archive
 Worldcat.org
 Amazon.com for some Opus numbers and individual movements

Lists of compositions by composer